Harold Haley (birth unknown – death unknown) was a professional rugby league footballer who played in the 1930s and 1940s.

Playing career

County honours
Harold Haley won a cap for Yorkshire while at Castleford , he played  in the 10-10 draw with Lancashire at Headingley Rugby Stadium, Leeds on Wednesday 26 October 1938.

County League appearances
Harold Haley played in Castleford's victories in the Yorkshire County League during the 1932–33 season and 1938–39 season.

Challenge Cup Final appearances
Harold Haley played  in Castleford's 11-8 victory over Huddersfield in the 1934–35 Challenge Cup Final at Wembley Stadium, London on Saturday 4 May 1935, in front of a crowd of 39,000.

Honoured at Castleford Tigers
Harold Haley is a Tigers Hall Of Fame Inductee.

References

External links
Search for "Haley" at rugbyleagueproject.org

Castleford Tigers players
English rugby league players
Place of birth missing
Place of death missing
Rugby league hookers
Year of birth missing
Year of death missing
Yorkshire rugby league team players